Kayanis may refer to:

 Kayanis (musician), Polish musician
 Kayani clan, an agnatic clan with branches in Pakistan, Afghanistan and Iran